Manning Jeter was a college football player and official. He played for coach Billy Laval at Furman as a guard, selected All-Southern by Herman Stegeman in 1920.

References

Furman Paladins football players
All-Southern college football players
American football guards
American football officials